"All I Want" is a song written by American singer and songwriter Olivia Rodrigo for the mockumentary television series High School Musical: The Musical: The Series. It was performed by Rodrigo's character, Nina "Nini" Salazar-Roberts, in the fourth episode of the first season, "Blocking", which premiered on Disney+ on November 29, 2019. A ballad with piano and strings, "All I Want" was written in three days while Rodrigo was filming the first season. The song was produced by Matthew Tishler and recorded live for the episode during filming. It was released on November 27, 2019, through Walt Disney Records as a promotional single from the album High School Musical: The Musical: The Series: The Soundtrack.

Despite not being promoted as a radio single, "All I Want" was a minor hit; it debuted on the U.S. Billboard Hot 100 at number 90 in January 2020, mainly due to downloads. It was a trend on the social media platform TikTok and has been certified Platinum by the Recording Industry Association of America—this success led to a contract with Interscope Records and the release of Rodrigo's debut single, "Drivers License", in 2021. "All I Want" is the most successful song from High School Musical: The Musical: The Series, and has been described as Rodrigo's "breakout hit".

Composition

"All I Want" is a pop ballad featuring piano and string instruments. The song's arrangement was described as "traditional, [1970s], singer-songwriter style, with a sprinkle of showtune sparkle". In an episode of Verified by Genius, Rodrigo explained that the line "Is it something wrong with me?" came from a conversation with her mother about relationships.

Promotion

The scene with Rodrigo performing "All I Want" on High School Musical: The Musical: The Series was released to YouTube on the same day as its episode release. A number of videos were additionally released via Disney Music's Vevo channel, including a lyric video, an alternate video, and a live studio performance. Rodrigo performed the song on Live with Kelly and Ryan in February 2020, and for Z100 New York the following month. She also performed the song on the ukulele for Disney Channel's Summer Sing-Along on July 10, 2020.

A music video for "All I Want" was released on March 20, 2020 featuring Rodrigo playing a piano in a pink tulle dress with mountains in the background, accompanied by a string quartet. Directed by Stephen Wayne Mallett, it was filmed at the Bonneville Salt Flats in Wendover, Utah. A making-of for the music video and an American Sign Language version were also released.

Julia Lester covered "All I Want" as part of the #HSMTMTSCoverChallenge, where the cast members of High School Musical: The Musical: The Series covered songs originally performed by other characters. "All I Want" was also covered by a cappella group DCappella, and included on the track listing of their Japan-exclusive album All Ears, released in June 2020.

Commercial performance
"All I Want" debuted on the U.S. Billboard Hot 100 at number 90 in January 2020, and stayed on the chart for two weeks. The song was not promoted as a radio single and its appearance on the chart was attributed mainly to download sales. It was certified Gold by the Recording Industry Association of America on April 23, 2020 for 500,000 digital units. The success of Rodrigo's debut single "Drivers License" in early 2021 led to a resurgence of "All I Want" internationally, with a position of 119 on the Billboard Global 200 chart for the week ending January 30. The song has reached the top 40 on the UK Singles Chart and the Irish Singles Chart.

Track listing

Credits and personnel
Credits adapted from Tidal.
 Matthew Tishler – Producer
 Olivia Rodrigo – Composer, lyricist
 Vic Florencia – Mixer, studio personnel

Charts

Certifications

References

2010s ballads
2019 songs
Olivia Rodrigo songs
Pop ballads
Songs from High School Musical (franchise)
Songs from television series
Songs written by Olivia Rodrigo
High School Musical: The Musical: The Series